James Michael McMillan (born 14 June 1978) is a New Zealand cricketer who plays for Otago in the State Championship. He was born in Christchurch. He is the cousin of Craig McMillan.

See also
 List of Otago representative cricketers

External links
James McMillan profile
 

1978 births
Living people
New Zealand cricketers
Otago cricketers
South Island cricketers
Place of birth missing (living people)